Blooddrunk is the sixth album by Finnish melodic death metal band Children of Bodom, released on 7 April 2008 through Spinefarm Records. The album includes a re-recorded version single for "Tie My Rope". Various editions feature one or two cover songs as bonus tracks. The limited edition digipak version of the album includes a bonus DVD with 5.1 surround mixes of all songs and the video and making-of for "Blooddrunk". It sold 20,000 copies during its first week of release.

The band recorded a cover of the Suicidal Tendencies song "War Inside My Head" during the recording sessions for this album, but the song was not released on Blooddrunk. The song was released on the cover album Skeletons in the Closet together with two new covers plus some old ones as well. The song "Done With Everything, Die For Nothing" is a playable song in Guitar Hero 5, which some players consider to be one of the game's harder songs. The album includes more thrash metal than its predecessors.

Production
While writing and recording the album, Alexi Laiho had stated he felt very aggressive, and as a consequence the songs would be faster and "thrashier" than the songs displayed on their previous release, Are You Dead Yet?. He notified fans, however, that certain parts of the album would also be more progressive, as heard on "LoBodomy". The lyrics cover similar territory as previous releases.

Release
The first single was the title track, which was released in Finland on 27 February 2008 and features the cover song "Lookin' Out My Back Door" as a B-side. The videos for "Blooddrunk" and "Hellhounds on My Trail" were shot in Berlin, Germany, in December 2007. Blooddrunk entered the Billboard 200 at number 22, making it the band's highest charted album thus far in their career, and the third highest death or black metal recording chart in the USA, just behind Dethklok's debut The Dethalbum and second album Dethalbum II.

The band streamed "Blooddrunk" on their MySpace page a week before its release.

The album went gold in Finland on pre-orders alone, and topped the Finnish charts beating its nearest rival in sales by 7 to 1. But the album did have a reasonably negative reaction from their long-term fans, many of which disliked the band's new sound and style.

Track listing

Personnel

Children Of Bodom
Alexi Laiho – lead guitar, lead vocals
Roope Latvala – rhythm guitar, backing vocals, guitar solo on "Banned from Heaven"  
Henkka Seppälä – bass, backing vocals
Janne Wirman – keyboards
Jaska Raatikainen – drums
Kimberly Goss – lyrics on "LoBodomy"

Production
Produced, recorded, and mixed by Mikko Karmila
Vocals recorded by Peter Tägtgren
Keyboards recorded by Janne Wirman
Mastered by Mika Jussila
Cover art and photos by Jussi Hyttinen/Kerosin
Layout by Miikka Tikka and Jussi Hyttinen

Charts

References

2008 albums
Children of Bodom albums
Spinefarm Records albums